Maksym Serhiyovych Prokopenko (Максим Сергійович Прокопенко; born March 23, 1984 in Vilshanka, Kirovohrad Oblast) is a Ukrainian-born Azerbaijani sprint canoer who has competed since 2002.

Competing for Ukraine, Prokopenko was the Canadian canoe C-1 500 m silver medallist at the 2002 Junior European Championships in Zagreb. He won a bronze medal in the C-2 1000 m event at the 2006 ICF Canoe Sprint World Championships in Szeged.

Competing in two Summer Olympics also for Ukraine, Prokopenko earned his best finish of eighth in the C-2 500 m event at Beijing in 2008.

Prokopenko moved to Azerbaijan after the 2008 Summer Olympics and won two medals for his new nation at the 2009 ICF Canoe Sprint World Championships in Dartmouth, Nova Scotia with a silver in the C-2 1000 m and a bronze in the C-2 500 m events. He also won a silver in the C-2 500 m event at the 2010 championships.

He and teammate Serhiy Bezuhliy finished fourth for Azerbaijan in the men's C-2 1000 m at the 2012 Summer Olympics.

References

1984 births
Azerbaijani male canoeists
Canoeists at the 2004 Summer Olympics
Canoeists at the 2008 Summer Olympics
Canoeists at the 2012 Summer Olympics
Living people
Olympic canoeists of Ukraine
Olympic canoeists of Azerbaijan
Ukrainian male canoeists
ICF Canoe Sprint World Championships medalists in Canadian